Floating is a 1997 American drama film written and directed by William Roth and starring Norman Reedus. The film marks Reedus' feature film appearance debut.

Plot
Floating is the tale of a young man's coming of age struggle set against a turbulent emotional time and financial woes. Van's life is altered at age sixteen by a car accident during which his father's legs were severed. Van's mother, who is unable to endure her husband's alcoholism and his depression, which leads to financial loss, has abandoned the family. Van is left to shoulder the responsibility for his embittered father, with no one to help him through his own pain and problems.

Cast
Norman Reedus as Van
Chad Lowe as Doug
Will Lyman as Van's Father
Sybil Temchen as Julie
Casey Affleck as Prep #1
Robert Harriell as Steve
Jonathan Quint as Jason
Josh Marchette as Flip
Bruce Kenny as Coach
Linda Roth as Screeing Woman #1
Arnold Roth as Screening Man #1
Ali Raisin as Girl #1

References

External links
 
 

1997 films
1997 drama films
1990s American films
1990s English-language films
American drama films
Films about amputees
Films about father–son relationships
Films scored by David Mansfield